Jailolo is on the island of Halmahera in Indonesia's Maluku Islands and may refer to either:
 Jailolo (town)
 Sultanate of Jailolo
 Jailolo volcanic complex